Cynthia Kierscht is an official at the United States Department of State who has served as the United States Ambassador to Mauritania since June 22, 2021. President Biden on January 23, 2023, announced his intent to nominate Kierscht as the United States' next Ambassador Extraordinary and Plenipotentiary to the Republic of Djibouti.

Education
Kierscht is a 1983 graduate of Fargo North High School. She earned her Bachelor of Arts from Carleton College and her Master of Public Policy from the John F. Kennedy School of Government.

Career
Kierscht is a career member of the Senior Foreign Service, class of Counselor. She served as the Director and Deputy Director of the Office of Canadian Affairs for the State Department. She currently serves as the Deputy Assistant Secretary for Canada, Haiti and the Caribbean in the Bureau of Western Hemisphere Affairs. She has served in different capacities at United States Embassies; From 2013 to 2016, while in Bogotá, Colombia she served as the Cultural Affairs Officer and as the Deputy Management Counselor from 2011 to 2013. Other assignments include Rabat, Morocco, and Cairo, Egypt, as well as serving in the United States Consulate in Marseille, France, and at the United States Interests Section in Tripoli, Libya.  Among her other assignments at the State Department, Kierscht worked in the Executive Secretariat and the Operations Center, in the Bureau of Near Eastern Affairs, and in the Bureau of Counterterrorism and Countering Violent Extremism.

Ambassadorial nomination
On June 15, 2020, President Donald Trump nominated Kierscht to be the next United States Ambassador to Mauritania. On June 18, 2020, her nomination was sent to the Senate. She appeared before the Senate Foreign Relations Committee on December 2 and was confirmed via voice vote by the entire Senate on December 22, 2020. She was sworn in on January 27, 2021. She presented her credentials to President Mohamed Ould Ghazouani on June 22, 2021.

Personal life 
Kierscht speaks Arabic, French, and Spanish.

See also
List of ambassadors of the United States

References

Year of birth missing (living people)
Living people
Place of birth missing (living people)
Carleton College alumni
Harvard Kennedy School alumni
United States Foreign Service personnel
21st-century American diplomats
American women diplomats
American diplomats
United States Department of State officials
21st-century American women